Li Shucai (born December 1965) is a Chinese petrologist who is a professor, doctoral supervisor and vice-president of Shandong University. He is a member of the Chinese Society for Rock Mechanics & Engineering (CSRME). He is one of the Editors-in-Chief for Tunnelling and Underground Space Technology.

Biography
Li was born in Laishui County, Hebei, in December 1965. He enrolled at Shandong Mining Institute (now Shandong University of Science and Technology) where he received his B.Eng. degree in 1987 and his M.Eng. degree in 1990. After receiving his Ph.D. degree from the Institute of Rock and Soil Mechanics, Chinese Academy of Sciences (CAS) in 1996, he stayed for researching. He moved to Shandong University in 2000 as Dean of the School of Civil Engineering and Director of the Geotechnical and Structural Engineering Research Center.

Honours and awards
 2006 the 9th China Youth Science and Technology Award
 November 22, 2019 Member of the Chinese Academy of Engineering (CAE)

References

External links
Li Shucai on Shandong University  

1965 births
Living people
People from Laishui County
Engineers from Hebei
Petrologists
Shandong University of Science and Technology alumni
Academic staff of Shandong University
Members of the Chinese Academy of Engineering